James Barry Keefer (born May 17, 1949), better known by his stage name Keith, is an American vocalist. His best known song was "98.6" which reached No. 7 on Billboard Hot 100 in 1966. He legally changed his name to Bazza Keefer in 1988, in memory of his mother.

Early life 
James Barry Keefer was born on May 17, 1949 in Philadelphia, Pennsylvania, United States.

Career

Early days
Keefer earned his first recording contract with Columbia Records. When Jerry Ross moved across to Mercury Records he took Keefer with him, and the singer soon appeared in the Billboard Hot 100 chart, with his 1966 solo single, "Ain't Gonna Lie".

Chart success
He is best remembered for his hit "98.6"; the recording was issued on the Mercury Records label, and reached No. 24 in the UK Singles Chart in 1967. It was considerably better received in his homeland – the single reached No. 7, and remained for 14 weeks in the bestsellers in the Billboard Hot 100 chart. It sold over one million copies worldwide, earning a gold disc. The track was written by Tony Powers (lyrics) and George Fischoff (music), arranged by Joe Renzetti, and was produced by Jerry Ross.
Its title relates to the normal human body temperature in degrees Fahrenheit.

His debut album, 98.6/Ain't Gonna Lie, was also issued on the Mercury label.

Later days
His 1968 second Mercury LP, Out of Crank, failed to sell well. The low point in Keefer's life came when United States Army officials arrested him for draft evasion during a concert tour. "I was making coffee for generals," said Keefer. When he got out, Keith did some independent recording and joined Frank Zappa's 1974 touring band. "I think they brought me in to commercialize Frank," Keefer said. Contrary to popular belief, he never sang in Zappa's band. Soon afterward, he recorded three singles for Zappa's DiscReet Records label.

Keefer recorded one last album in 1969, The Adventures of Keith, for RCA Records. It did not sell well, and he then left the music industry until 1986, when an attempted comeback under his real name proved unsuccessful.

He set up A.I.R. Records in 1986 in Redondo Beach, California, and produced albums for several local musicians. These included the singer-songwriter Chuck Hill, and Keith's drummer Shawn Smith, who were both from Denver, Colorado.

In the 1990s, the singer moved into the television industry, although he continues to play live dates.

Discography

Singles
Keith and the Admirations

Keith

Albums

See also
List of performers on Top of the Pops
List of one-word stage names

References

External links
Official Keith website

1949 births
Living people
American male singers
Mercury Records artists
Musicians from Philadelphia
RCA Records artists
Singers from Pennsylvania